Members of the New South Wales Legislative Council who served in the 55th Parliament were elected at the 2007 and 2011 elections. As members serve eight-year terms, half of the Council was elected in 2007 and did not face re-election in 2011, and the members elected in 2011 did not face re-election until 2019. The President was Don Harwin.

References

Members of New South Wales parliaments by term
21st-century Australian politicians
New South Wales Legislative Council